New Exchequer Dam is a concrete–faced, rock-fill dam on the Merced River in central California in the United States. The Merced Irrigation District (MID) operates the dam and was also responsible for its construction.

At the time of completion, it was the largest dam of its kind in the world. The dam is named for the town of Exchequer which now lies under the reservoir, while the reservoir is named for Wilbur F. McClure, the State Engineer of California during construction.

History
In 1926, after five years of planning and construction, MID completed the Exchequer or "Great Exchequer" Dam across the Merced River six miles (9.7 km) above the town of Merced Falls. Although the dam was to serve primarily for irrigation, power production began ceremoniously on June 23, 1926 with a press of a telegraph key by President Calvin Coolidge, starting the turbines at a 31 megawatt hydroelectric plant.

By the 1950s, it became apparent that the limited storage capacity at Exchequer was no longer enough to serve the needs of farmers in the Merced River valley. A high dam was proposed to be built just downstream, creating a reservoir nearly four times the size of Exchequer.

Construction of New Exchequer Dam began on July 8, 1964, directly downstream from the old concrete arch dam. Tudor Engineering Company of San Francisco was responsible for the design of the new dam. The old Exchequer Dam was incorporated as an upstream toe to help support the rock-fill embankment, which was then armored with a layer of reinforced concrete. The dam was topped out in early 1967 and the power plant went into commercial operation by July.

As the new reservoir filled, it inundated an additional  of the Merced River canyon and buried sections of the historic Yosemite Valley Railroad and the mining town of Bagby under  of water. MID began to repair the leaks in the fall of 1985 under orders from the California Division of Safety of Dams.

The dam has been able to halt major floods in many instances, such as the New Year's Day Flood of 1997.

Dimensions and usage

The dam's power station has a capacity of 94.5 megawatts and generates about 316 million kilowatt hours annually.

To fulfill downstream flood control requirements, the reservoir will only be allowed to rise into the flood-control pool if the flow downstream at Stevinson is forecast to exceed .

However, this has met with controversy because it would result in part-time flooding of a portion of the Merced River designated Wild and Scenic. Opponents also point out that the raise is unnecessary, since the reservoir has never overflowed due to flooding since its completion in the mid-1960s.

Lake McClure is also extensively developed for recreational activities, with 515 campsites, four boat ramps and two marinas. In 1992, the lake received 606,000 visitor-days, mostly from May to September.

See also
List of dams and reservoirs in California
List of largest reservoirs of California
List of power stations in California
List of reservoirs and dams in California
List of the tallest dams in the United States
Water in California

References

External links
Photos of original Exchequer Dam

Dams in California
Dams in the San Joaquin River basin
Merced River
Buildings and structures in Mariposa County, California
United States local public utility dams
Concrete-face rock-fill dams
Dams completed in 1967
1967 establishments in California
Hydroelectric power plants in California